Friedrich Hagenauer (1829–1909) was a Presbyterian minister and missionary in Australia who established Ebenezer Mission and Ramahyuck mission.
Reverend Friedrich Hagenauer and Reverend F.W. Spieseke from the German Moravian Church were sent to Australia and established Ebenezer Mission station near Lake Hindmarsh, Victoria, Australia in 1859 in Wergaia territory.

In 1863 Hagenauer established Ramahyuck Mission on the banks of the Avon River near Lake Wellington to house the members of the Gunai people who survived massacres and attacks in west and central Gippsland. The name combines "Ramah", the home of Samuel in the First Book of Kings, with "yuck", an Aboriginal term reputedly meaning "our place". The mission sought to discourage all tribal ritual and culture,  and replace it with Christian values and European customs. The Mission closed in 1908 and the few remaining residents were moved to Lake Tyers Mission.

He played a significant role in lobbying the Board for the Protection of Aborigines (BPA) to introduce the nicknamed 'Half-Caste Act' which forced Aboriginal people under 34 years of age with non-Aboriginal parentage to leave missions. This created much distress for Aboriginal people as outlined in letters written to the BPA which document requests for permission to visit family left on missions and for provision of basic needs from people struggling to survive in a racist white society.

An example of this was the case of Bessie Flower who was a star pupil at her Aboriginal school. Hagenauer appears to have encouraged her to come to his mission to teach but the covert plan was for her to marry one of his star converts. Bessie's parents were both Aboriginals whereas Hagenauer's convert and her husband designate, Adolph Donald Cameron, was a half-caste. They married when Bessie was 17 and they had eight children. Both Adolph and Bessie left Hagenauer employment but Bessie found that the authorities were trying to separate her from her children. The Secretary (CEO) of the body in charge was Hagenauer.

See also 

 Hagenauer, Friedrich August (1829–1909) in the Australian Dictionary of Biography 
 Hagenauer, Rev. Friedrich August (1829-1910) in German Missionaries in Australia

References

Australian Presbyterian missionaries
Presbyterian missionaries in Australia
1829 births
1909 deaths
People from Greiz (district)